Shenzhen International BT Leadership Summit is a biology-focused business conference. It is held each year in September. It is arranged by the Shenzhen Municipal People's Government. It is held at the Shenzhen Convention and Exhibition Center.

The Shenzhen government development emphasizes biology and the life science industry as an important element of economic guidance and industrial restructuring. The government issued an industrial development plan for biology and life science industry to give strong support for policies, funds, projects and talents.

Structure 
The Summit is composed of three parts: speeches, dialogue and a professional forum. Under the aim of “Committed to accelerating the integration and development of global biological resources, science and technology, industry, capital”, the summit calls on experts, scholars and entrepreneurs at home and abroad to discuss new models, explore new directions and build a new environment around issues, technology trends, industry information and policy in the development of biology and life science technology and industry.

Previous summits

2017  
The Summit was held 21–23 September 2017. Its theme was to develop wisdom and great health, build the new engine of industry. It was supported by the Ministry of science and technology, China Biotechnology Development Center, China Medicinal Biotechnology Association and the China Quality Association for Pharmaceuticals. The sponsors were Shenzhen Development and Reform Commission and Shenzhen Science and Technology Innovation Committee.

Keynote speakers 
 Barry Marshall, Nobel prize in Physiology or Medicine in 2005, foreign academicians of Chinese Academy of Engineering, Australian scientists.
 Rao Yi, lifelong tenured professor of Peking University, director of the Science Department of Peking University.

Dialogues 
 Development trend and task of innovative drugs
 Opportunity and challenge of big data development of health care

Professional fora 
 Transformation and application of nanobiological technology in medical field
 Innovation application and development of big data development of health care
 Prospect of innovation and entrepreneurship of precision medicine
 Tumor molecular diagnosis and individualized treatment
 New directions in investment of immunization therapy
 Development of new cardiovascular and cerebrovascular diagnostic industry
 Key technology forum for generic drug development frontier and consistency evaluation
 Shenzhen Hong Kong health services Development Forum
 Index system of regional health assessment for life economy
 The Sixteenth International Conference on Bioinformatics--- Bioinformatics data mining and Application Forum faced for precision medical services
 Discussion on biopharmaceutical industry based on Microbiology

2016  
The theme was “developing green economy and creating a better life”.

Keynotes 
 New model of cross - Pacific cooperation in cancer precision medical industry
 Advances in biological therapy and biotechnology drugs

Dialogue 
 BT innovation industry circle in the era of big health

Professional forum 
 Smart medicine in the era of big data
 Cell therapy leads the revolution of medical technology
 Drug listing permit holder system preach and bio innovation drug research and development forum
 Development and future strategy of medical robot industry
 The “bounce back” of xenotransplantation
 Gene sequencing industry development
 “Shenzhen international Bio Valley” precision medical international collaborative innovation
 Health industry and scientific and technological innovation development in Shenzhen, Hong Kong

Participants 
 Dinshaw J. Patel，professor of MemorialSloan-Kettering Cancer Center Fellow of the National Academy of Science, Fellow of American Academy of Arts and Sciences
 Hans Lehrach，Academician of Germany's Academy of Sciences
 Peter. E. Lobie, PhD, Professor, National Cancer Institute, Singapore; Academician, Royal Academy of Sciences, New Zealand
 Robert Desimone Member of US National Academy of Sciencs, Doris and Don Berkey Professor, Dept of Brain and Cognitive Sciences, Director of McGovern Institute for Brain Research at MIT
 Byoung S. Kwon, PhD, Investigator, Korea National Cancer Institute
 Christopher Reinhard, Chairman, Taxus Cardium Pharmaceutical Group
 Chen Yuzong, Professor of the National University of Singapore
 David Baghurst, chairman of Isis innovation of science and Technology (HK) Co., Ltd
 Dr. George Ye，founder，Chief Scientific Officer and President of Anogen-Yes Biotech Laboratories
 Guoping Feng, Poitras Professorship of Neuroscience at the Department of Brain and Cognitive Sciences
 Gerard Marriott, PhD, Professor, UC Berkeley, Department of Biophysics
 Hendrik-Jan Schuurman, Consultant and Director, SchuBiomed Consultancy (Utrecht, the Netherlands)
 Ivor Royston，Professor of University of California, San Diego, School of Medicine
 Je Ho Lee, MD, Clinical Professor and Director, Cancer Center/Gynecology, Bundang Cha University Hospital
 Low Kin Huat，Professor of Nanyang Technological University
 Lung-Ji Chang, Director of immunology, Cancer Center in Florida University
 Peng Bin, Director of Novartis Cancer Drug Translational Science Center, Shanghai, China
 Richard Y. Zhao, PhD, Professor, Institute of Microbiology, Immunology, Human Viruses, University of Maryland
 Tadashi Matsumoto, PhD, President and CEO, ReqMed
 Wei-Wei Zhang, MD, PhD, Chairman, Adventin Inc.; Honorary President of US-China Entrepreneurs Association
 Xurong Jiang, PhD, Chief, Quality and Technology, BioVentures, AstraZeneca
 Yves Decadt, PhD, CEO BioLingus
 Yifan Dai, Associate Professor, Thomas E. Starzl Transplantation Institute, University of Pittsburgh
 Yiwu He, PhD, MBA  Senior Vice President, Global Head of R&D, BGI
 Gu Ying，Academician of the Chinese Academy of Sciences
 Wei Yuquan, Vice President of Sichuan University,  Academician of Chinese Academy of Sciences
 Jizong Zhao，Member of Chinese Academy of Sciences, director of the Department of Neurosurgery, Tiantan hospital
 Zhang Bo, Professor in Tsinghua University, Fellow of the Chinese Academy of Sciences
 Gao Changqing, chief physician of General Hospital of PLA, Academician of Chinese Academy of Engineering
 Lanjuan Li，Academician of Chinese Academy of Engine
 Shi Xuemin, doctoral tutor， Chinese Academy of Engineering
 Qimin Zhan, Member of Chinese Academy of Engineering, Professor at Peking Union Medical College Director of Peking University Health Science Center
 Chen Wei, China International Economic and Exchange Center, director of the Institute of Innovation and Development
 Xun Chen，Independent Director of Board and President of the Special Commission, Qihoo 360 Technology Co
 Zhekuan Fu, Chairman of QF Capital
 Benjamin W. Wah，American Association for the Advancement of Science (AAAS), Provost of the Chinese University of Hong Kong
 Han Weidong, Director of the Laboratory of Immunology, PLA General Hospital (i.e. 301 Hospital)
 Bai Lu  Professor and Executive Vice Dean, School of Medicine, Tsinghua University; Research focus on neuroscience, translational research and drug discovery
 Baoyan Liu，Vice president of China Academy of Chinese Medical Sciences
 Hong Liu，Hong Liu, IBM General Manager of China Health and Life Sciences Industry
 Liu Guoqing, the executive director of China International Capital
 Liangxue Lai, Dean, College of Animal Science and Veterinary Medicine, Jilin University
 Zuhong Lu, Country "Thousand Talents Program" Distinguished experts
 Dinggang Li, MD, President, Beijing Daopei Hospital
 Li Xiaoyu, Associate Professor Hong Kong University
 Li XiaoYi, Dr. Lee's Pharmaceutical Holdings Limited chief executive and founder, vice chairman of the Hong Kong Biotechnology Association
 Dr. Jian Ni, CEO, The National Engineering Research Center of Antibody Medicine (CMAB)
 Nianmin Qi, Professor of School of Pharmacy in Shanghai Jiaotong University
 Lingyun Sun, Vice President of Nanjing drum tower hospital affiliated to Nanjing university medical school, Supervisor of Ph.D candidates
 Tian Wei, President of Beijing Ji Shui Tan Hospital
 Mingyuan Wu, CEO of Zhongyuan Union cell gene engineering Corporation Limited
 Wang Hongguang, Advisor, Deputy Director General, Chinese Academy of Science and Technology for Development (CASTED), Ministry of Science and Technology
 Steven Wang，Managing and Founding Partner
 Wang Shuxin，the chief scientist of Shandong Weigao surgical robot Co. Ltd., director of the joint research center of Tianjin University - Weigao group medical robot, Tianjin University professor
 WenXiong Wang, the Chair Professor in the Life Science Division and the Director of Marine Environmental Laboratory in Shenzhen Research Institute of the HKUST
 Min Xue，CEO of Shanghai United Imaging Healthcare co., Ltd
 Xu Huafeng，China Health Care Association, vice chairman and secretary general
 Zhengguo Yang, chairman of the board, Shanxi Aierfu ActivTissue Engineering Co., Ltd
 Zhang Lianshan, deputy general manager and global vice president for research and development of Jiangsu Hengrui pharmaceutical co., Ltd
 Liwei Zhang，vice president of Beijing Tian Tan Hospital, Capital Medical University
 Zhang Fenglou, former Deputy Minister of Health, former chairman of the China Health Care Association
 Zhang Ji, chief scientist for new drug research and development of Hopeful Ecological Company pharmaceutical, Guangdong
 Yuan-Ting Zhang，fellow of International Academy for Medical and Biological Engineering
 Karl Tsim, chair professor of Division of Life Science, and the Director of Center for Chinese Medicine R & D at the Hong Kong University of Science and Technology (HKUST)
 Zhiming Cai, Chief Scientist of National ‘‘973’’ Key Basic Research
 Cai Lintao, principal investigator and the director of Institute of Biomedicine and Biotechnology, Shenzhen Institutes of Advanced Technology, Chinese Academy of Science
 Jiankui He, chairman Of Direct Genomics Co., Ltd
 Ningzheng Luo, founder and CEO of ‘Your Online Hospital’
 Ye Li, director of Scientific Research and Research Center for Biomedical Information Technology, Shenzhen Institutes of Advanced Technology, Chinese Academy of Sciences
 Li Guanglin, director of institute of advanced integration technology (SIAIT), SIAT
 Chen Qiu,（Chairman of the forum、host）  Director of Shenzhen People's Hospital
 Xizhuo Sun, Director of Shenzhen Luohu Hospital Group
 Xiangjun Zhou, Ph.D, Vice CEO of HRYZ BIOTECH Co.Ltd, chief scientist

2015 
The theme was “developing green economy and creating a better life”.

Keynotes 
 Fight cancer: CarT therapy for cancer
 Translational medicine: opportunities and challenges
 Biotechnology innovation in the era of great health

Dialogues 
 Opportunities and challenges in the era of precision medical care
 Biological medicine, medical technology and instrument supervision policy

Professional forum 
 The integration of global customers and industry
 Brain & Future
 New techniques and trends in cell therapy and The awarding ceremony of Shenzhen synthetic cell bank, Shenzhen (North Science) regional cell preparation center
 New medical materials and 3D printing
 Internet Finance + Medical Innovation Seminar
 Synthetic biology and industrial applications
 Modernization and internationalization of traditional Chinese Medicine
 Explore the innovation way of Chinese pharmaceutical enterprises in new situation

2014

Keynotes 
 The new future of human biology and biomedical research
 Intelligence development of big data and medical health industry

Professional forum 
 High end biomedical engineering in the information age
 Chinese medicine and marine biological medicine industry development forum
 Application of biotechnology in modern agricultural economy
 Cell therapy and regenerative medicine
 Personalized medical care in the whole genome era
 Policy innovation in the field of health care

References

Intergovernmental organizations